The Pelym or Bolshoy Pelym is a river in the far north of Sverdlovsk Oblast, Russia.

The Pelym has its sources on the eastern slopes of the northern Ural Mountains and flows from there over wooded areas of the West Siberian Plain. The river is frozen over from October to April.

It is navigable on the lower .

References 

Rivers of Sverdlovsk Oblast